Bill Holm (August 25, 1943 – February 25, 2009) was an American poet, essayist, memoirist, and musician. He was a frequent guest on A Prairie Home Companion.

Biography
Holm was born on a farm north of Minneota, Minnesota in 1943 and attended Gustavus Adolphus College in St. Peter, Minnesota where he graduated in 1965. Later, he attended the University of Kansas. He was Professor of English at Southwest Minnesota State University, where he taught classes on poetry and literature until his retirement in 2007.

Holm was named the McKnight Distinguished Artist of the Year in 2008. This award celebrates artists who have left a significant imprint on the culture of Minnesota. Holm was named a Bush Foundation Arts Fellow in 1982 and 1995 and a National Endowment for the Arts Fellow in 1987.  He received Minnesota Book Awards in 1991 and 1997.  For his service to Iceland, he earned the Sue M. Cobb Award for Exemplary Diplomatic Service in 2003. In 1991, Gustavus Adolphus College awarded Holm a Distinguished Alumni Citation and in 2002 he received an honorary doctorate.

He was the grandson of Icelandic immigrants and spent part of every year at his second home in Hofsós, Iceland. Holm died February 25, 2009, in Sioux Falls, South Dakota at 65 years, of complications of pneumonia.

Books
Holm is the author of twelve books of poems and essays:
Boxelder Bug Variations: A Meditation on an Idea in Language and Music, 1985 
The Music of Failure, 1986
Coming Home Crazy: An Alphabet of China Essays, 1990 
The Dead Get By with Everything, 1991 
Chocolate Chip Cookies For Your Enemies, 1993
Landscape of Ghosts, 1993
The Heart Can Be Filled Anywhere on Earth, 1996 
Playing Haydn for the Angel of Death, 1997
Faces of Christmas Past, 1998
Eccentric Islands, 2000 
Playing the Black Piano, 2004 
Windows of Brimnes: An American in Iceland, 2007

Audio books
Holm has published 4 audio books of poems and essays on CD:
Holmward Bound - An Evening With Bill Holm, (EssayAudio.com, 2001)
Faces of Christmas Past, (EssayAudio.com, 2002)
Notes From the Black Piano, (EssayAudio.com, 2004)
There Is No Other Way to Speak – Voices, (EssayAudio.com, 2005)

References

External links

 Audio Publisher website
 
 Bill Holm: Through The Windows Of Brimnes Documentary produced by Prairie Public Television
Bill Holm interviewed by Chris Dodge, Northern Lights TV Series #17 (1988):  https://reflections.mndigital.org/catalog/p16022coll38:243#/kaltura_video
Bill Holm interviewed by Steve Benson, Northern Lights TV Series #287 (1994):  https://reflections.mndigital.org/catalog/p16022coll38:315#/kaltura_video
Bill Holm interviewed by Beth Weatherby in Minneota, Minnesota (Part One), Northern Lights TV Series #390 (1997):  https://reflections.mndigital.org/catalog/p16022coll38:81#/kaltura_video
Bill Holm interviewed by Beth Weatherby in Minneota, Minnesota (Part Two), Northern Lights TV Series #391 (1997):  https://reflections.mndigital.org/catalog/p16022coll38:82#/kaltura_video
Bill Holm interviews Southwest Minnesota Poet Leo Daniel (1988), Northern Lights TV Series #396 (1998):  https://reflections.mndigital.org/catalog/p16022coll38:86#/kaltura_video
Bill Holm and Jon Hassler discuss and read from their Christmas Books in Duluth, Northern Lights TV Series #416 (1998):  https://reflections.mndigital.org/catalog/p16022coll38:100#/kaltura_video

American male poets
Poets from Minnesota
American people of Icelandic descent
People from Minneota, Minnesota
Gustavus Adolphus College alumni
University of Kansas alumni
Southwest Minnesota State University faculty
1943 births
2009 deaths
20th-century American poets
20th-century American male writers